Emiliano Caffini (born 7 December 1989) is a retired Italian rugby union player. His usual position was as a Lock and he played for Fiamme Oro in Top12.

From 2012 to 2014 and in 2015–16 Pro12 season, Caffini played for Zebre.

After playing for Italy Under 20 in 2008 and 2009, from 2012 to 2015 Caffini was named in the Emerging Italy squad.

References

External links
It's Rugby Profile England
Eurosport Profile

1989 births
Living people
Italian rugby union players
Fiamme Oro Rugby players
Zebre Parma players
Rugby union locks